Stemonoporus is a genus of plants in the family Dipterocarpaceae.

Species
It contains the following species:
 Stemonoporus acuminatus - (Thwaites) P.S.Ashton
 Stemonoporus affinis - Thwaites
 Stemonoporus angustisepalus - Kosterm.
 Stemonoporus bullatus - Kosterm.
 Stemonoporus canaliculatus - Thwaites
 Stemonoporus ceylanicus - (Wight) Alston
 Stemonoporus cordifolius - (Thwaites) P.S.Ashton
 Stemonoporus elegans - Thwaites
 Stemonoporus gardneri - Thwaites
 Stemonoporus gilimalensis - Kosterm.
 Stemonoporus gracilis - Kosterm.
 Stemonoporus kanneliyensis - Kosterm.
 Stemonoporus laevifolius - Kosterm.
 Stemonoporus lanceolatus - Thwaites
 Stemonoporus lancifolius - (Thwaites) P.S.Ashton
 Stemonoporus latisepalus - Kosterm.
 Stemonoporus marginalis - Kosterm.
 Stemonoporus moonii - Thwaites
 Stemonoporus nitidus - Thwaites
 Stemonoporus oblongifolius - Thwaites
 Stemonoporus petiolaris - Thwaites
 Stemonoporus reticulatus - Thwaites
 Stemonoporus revolutus - Trimen ex Hook.f.
 Stemonoporus rigidus - Thwaites
 Stemonoporus scalarinervis - Kosterm.
 Stemonoporus scaphifolius - Kosterm.

References
This list has been compiled from the Dipterocarpaceae Data Base − held and maintained at the Royal Botanic Garden Edinburgh.

 
Malvales genera
Taxonomy articles created by Polbot